Mazian may refer to:
 Mazian, Gilan (مازيان - Māẕīān)